Johann Böhm may refer to:

 Johann Böhm (1895−1952), German Bohemian chemist
 Johann Böhm (historian) (1929−), Romanian-born German scholar
 Johann Böhm (German politician) (1937−), former president of the Bavarian Landtag
 Johann Böhm (Austrian politician) (1886–1959), former Austrian Minister of Social Affairs